Callipara bullatiana is a species of sea snail, a marine gastropod mollusk in the family Volutidae, the volutes.

Description
Average shell length of mature specimens is around 55 mm, 
but extremes can be as small as 40 mm, and as large as 80 mm.

Distribution
Endemic to South Africa, ranging from central Algulhas Bank
to around Port Elizabeth.

References

External links

Volutidae
Gastropods described in 1967